Heuilley-Cotton is a former commune in the Haute-Marne department in north-eastern France. On 1 January 2016, it was merged into the commune Villegusien-le-Lac. Its population was 290 in 2019.

See also
Communes of the Haute-Marne department

References

Heuilleycotton